An election to Louth County Council took place on 20 June 1985 as part of that year's Irish local elections. 26 councillors were elected from six electoral divisions by PR-STV voting for a five-year term of office.

Results by party

Results by Electoral Area

Ardee

Carlingford

Drogheda Rural

Drogheda Urban

Dundalk Rural

Dundalk Urban

External links
 Official website
 irishelectionliterature

1985 Irish local elections
1985